National Collegiate Hockey Conference is a National Collegiate Athletic Association (NCAA) Division I ice hockey-only conference that was created as a result of the formation of the Big Ten ice hockey conference.

The tournament began play in 2014 with an 8-team championship in three rounds. 

The NCHC tournament features a first round round of best of three series hosted by the higher seed, with the four winners advancing to the Frozen Faceoff.

The Frozen Faceoff was originally played at Target Center in Minneapolis, before moving to St. Paul's Xcel Energy Center beginning in 2018.  

Due to the Coronavirus pandemic the entire 2021 tournament was hosted by regular season champion North Dakota at the Ralph Engelstad Arena.

Champions

References

 
College ice hockey in the United States lists